John Maitland may refer to:

 Sir John Maitland, 1st Lord Maitland of Thirlestane (1537–1595), Commendator of Coldingham Priory
 John Maitland, 1st Earl of Lauderdale (died 1645), Viscount of Lauderdale, Viscount Maitland and Lord Thirlestane & Boltoun, 2nd Lord Maitland of Thirlestane
 John Maitland, 1st Duke of Lauderdale (1616–1682), 2nd Earl of Lauderdale
 John Maitland, 5th Earl of Lauderdale (1655–1710), Scottish judge and politician
 John Maitland (Haddington MP) (1732–1779), MP for Haddington Burghs, 1774–1880
 John Maitland (Chippenham MP) (c. 1754–1831), MP for Chippenham, 1806–1812 and 1817–1818
 John Maitland (Royal Navy officer) (1771–1836), Royal Navy admiral
 John Maitland (accountant) (1803–1865) Accountant to the Court of Session and Disruption Worthy
 John Gorham Maitland (1818–1863), English academic and civil servant
 John Maitland (Kirkcudbright MP) (1841–1922), MP for Kirkcudbright, 1874–1880
 Sir John Maitland (Conservative politician) (1903–1977), MP for Horncastle, 1945–1966
 John Maitland (British Army officer) (1732–1779), British commander in American Revolutionary War
 John Maitland (The Bill), a fictional police officer in the TV series The Bill
 Jack Maitland (born 1948), American football player
 John Whitaker Maitland (1831–1909), rector of Loughton, lord of the manor, and owner of Loughton Hall
 John W. Maitland, Jr., member of the Illinois Senate from 1979 until 2002.